Marcello Maiorana, C.R. (died 13 November 1586) was a Roman Catholic prelate who served as Bishop of Acerra (1581–1586) and Bishop of Crotone (1578–1581).

Biography
Marcello Maiorana was ordained a priest in the Congregation of Clerics Regular of the Divine Providence.
On 6 October 1578, he was appointed during the papacy of Pope Gregory XIII as Bishop of Crotone.

On 13 November 1581, he was transferred by Pope Gregory XIII to the diocese of Acerra. He served as Bishop of Acerra until his death on 13 November 1586.

While bishop, he was the principal co-consecrator of William Chisholm, Bishop of Vaison (1585).

References

External links and additional sources

16th-century Italian Roman Catholic bishops
Bishops appointed by Pope Gregory XIII
1586 deaths
Theatine bishops